Redding Township may refer to several places in the United States:

 Redding Township, Jackson County, Indiana
 Redding Township, Clare County, Michigan

See also 
 Reading Township (disambiguation)

Township name disambiguation pages